"Love Me" is the debut single by American rapper Lil Tecca. The track was originally released as a single on October 29, 2018, before being re-released as a single on July 15, 2019, to act as a pre-release single for his debut mixtape We Love You Tecca.

Music video 
The music video for the track was released on November 18, 2018, on Lil Tecca's official YouTube channel. It has racked up over 22 million views as of January 2020. The video was directed by David Del Rosario.

Critical reception 
Alphonse Pierre of Pitchfork called the track "impressive" and a "refreshing genre-fusing track", saying that Tecca "quickly separated himself from being labeled an A Boogie clone". Daniel Spielberger of HipHopDX gave the song a more mixed review, saying that although the track was a "pleasant dancehall vibe", and that Tecca "did a good job rapping along with the groove", he said the track had some "questionable production choices", and that "the heavy Auto-Tune and bizarre helium effects didn’t bode well with the more organic, breezy beat".

Commercial performance 
Following the debut of Lil Tecca's mixtape We Love You Tecca debuting at number four on the Billboard 200, the song debuted at number 97 the week ending September 13, 2019.

Charts

Weekly charts

Year-end charts

Certifications

References 

2018 singles
2018 songs
Lil Tecca songs
Republic Records singles
Songs written by Lil Tecca
Universal Music Group singles